Agata Smoktunowicz FRSE (born 12 October 1973) is a Polish mathematician who works as a professor at the University of Edinburgh. Her research is in abstract algebra.

Contributions
Smoktunowicz's contributions to mathematics include constructing noncommutative nil rings, solving a "famous problem" formulated in 1970 by Irving Kaplansky.
She proved the Artin–Stafford gap conjecture according to which the Gelfand–Kirillov dimension of a graded domain cannot fall within the open interval (2,3). She also found an example of a nil ideal of a ring R that does not lift to a nil ideal of the polynomial ring R[X], disproving a conjecture of Amitsur and hinting that the Köthe conjecture might be false.

Awards and honours
Smoktunowicz was an invited speaker at the International Congress of Mathematicians in 2006. She won the Whitehead Prize of the London Mathematical Society in 2006, the European Mathematical Society Prize in 2008, and the Sir Edmund Whittaker Memorial Prize of the Edinburgh Mathematical Society in 2009. In 2009, she was elected as a fellow of the Royal Society of Edinburgh, and in 2012, she became one of the inaugural fellows of the American Mathematical Society. She also won the Polish Academy of Sciences annual research prize in 2018.

Education and career
Smoktunowicz earned a master's degree from the University of Warsaw in 1997, a PhD in 1999 from the Institute of Mathematics of the Polish Academy of Sciences, and a habilitation in 2007, again from the Polish Academy of Sciences. After temporary positions at Yale University and the University of California, San Diego, she joined the University of Edinburgh in 2005, and was promoted to professor there in 2007.

Selected publications

.
.
.
.

References

1973 births
Living people
Polish women mathematicians
University of Warsaw alumni
Academics of the University of Edinburgh
Whitehead Prize winners
Fellows of the American Mathematical Society
Fellows of the Royal Society of Edinburgh
20th-century  Polish mathematicians
21st-century  Polish mathematicians
Algebraists
Polish emigrants to the United Kingdom
20th-century women mathematicians
21st-century women mathematicians
Sir Edmund Whittaker Memorial Prize winners